Michael Falzarano is an American guitarist, singer, and songwriter.  He has been a professional musician since the 1970s, most notably in Hot Tuna, the New Riders of the Purple Sage, and the Memphis Pilgrims, a Memphis-style rock and roll/blues band that he founded in 1986.

Falzarano released an album entitled We Are All One in 2008 on Woodstock Records and The King James Sessions in 2005 on Blues Planet Records. A re-released version of the song "Last Train Out," which he wrote in memory of the Allman Brothers Band and Gov't Mule bass player Allen Woody, appears on the record.  Blues Planet re-released Mecca, an album that Falzarano and the Memphis Pilgrims originally released in 1996 on Relix Records with guests Jorma Kaukonen, Pete Sears, and Harvey Sorgen of Hot Tuna and Danny Louis of Gov't Mule.

When not performing with his own band, Falzarano can be seen with Hot Tuna, the Jorma Kaukonen Trio, and the New Riders of the Purple Sage. Falzarano also produces other artists, and teaches guitar workshops at Jorma Kaukonen's Fur Peace Ranch.

In 2013, Falzarano's original composition "When There's Two There's Trouble" was featured in Alexandre Moors' critically acclaimed film Blue Caprice with Isaiah Washington, Tim Blake Nelson, and Joey Lauren Adams. Falzarano also appears in the movie.

Michael Falzarano's band the Englishtown Project plays covers of songs by the New Riders of the Purple Sage, the Grateful Dead, and the Marshall Tucker Band.

Discography
 Pair a Dice Found – Hot Tuna (1990)
 Live at Sweetwater – Hot Tuna (1992)
 Live at Sweetwater Two – Hot Tuna (1993)
 The Land of Heroes – Jorma Kaukonen (1995)
 Mecca – The Memphis Pilgrims (1996) 
 Christmas – Jorma Kaukonen (1996)
 Live in Japan – Hot Tuna (1997)
 Too Many Years – Jorma Kaukonen (1998)
 Rusted Root – Rusted Root (1998)
 Jorma Kaukonen Trio Live – Jorma Kaukonen (1999)
 And Furthurmore... – Hot Tuna (1999)
 The King James Sessions – Michael Falzarano (2006) 
 Wanted: Live at Turkey Trot – New Riders of the Purple Sage (2007)
 We Are All One – Michael Falzarano (2008)
 Where I Come From – New Riders of the Purple Sage (2009)
 17 Pine Avenue – New Riders of the Purple Sage (2012)
 I Got Blues for Ya – Michael Falzarano (2014)
 Family Business – Ronnie Penque (2019)
 A Kaleidoscope Christmas – Michael Falzarano and Extended Family (2020)

Notes

References

 
 
 Michael Falzarano discography at michaelfalzarano.com
 Bendersky, Ari. "Hot Tuna in the Raw", Rolling Stone, April 24, 1998.
 Bernstein, Scott. Michael Falzarano interview, Glide Magazine
 Collette, Doug. We Are All One album review, All About Jazz
 Conway, Jud. We Are All One album review, KindWeb, December 1, 2008

External links
 Michael Falzarano's official website

American rock guitarists
American male guitarists
Living people
Hot Tuna members
New Riders of the Purple Sage members
Year of birth missing (living people)